Solar power is the conversion of energy from sunlight into electricity. 

Solar Power may also refer to:

 Solar Power (album), by Lorde, 2021
 "Solar Power" (song), 2021
 Solar Power Tour, the 2022 world tour
 "Solar Power" (Superman: The Animated Series episode), 1997
 Solar Power International, annual conference organized by SEPA and SEIA

See also
 Solar power by country